The ABA Playoffs Most Valuable Player Award was an annual American Basketball Association (ABA) given in the ABA Playoffs. The award was first awarded in the 1968 ABA Playoffs, and was retired as part of the ABA–NBA merger. In sports, the player judged to be the most important to the team is the most valuable player (MVP).

The inaugural award winner was Pittsburgh Pipers' player Connie Hawkins. On all occasions, the player who wins the Playoffs MVP award is from the team that won the ABA championship. Julius Erving, who led the New York Nets to two ABA championships in 1974 and 1976, is the only player to win the award twice.

Winners

References

Playoffs Most Valuable Player Award
Most Valuable Player Award
American Basketball Association lists
Awards established in 1968
1968 establishments in the United States